Turbo walteri is a species of sea snail, a marine gastropod mollusk in the family Turbinidae, the turban snails.

Description
The length of the shell varies between 35 mm and 55 mm.

Distribution
This marine species occurs off Northwest Australia.

References

 Kreipl K. & Dekker H. (2009) A new species of Turbo from Western Australia (Mollusca, Gastropoda, Turbinidae). Visaya 2(4): 11-15.
 Alf A. & Kreipl K. (2011) The family Turbinidae. Subfamily Turbinidae, Genus Turbo. Errata, corrections and new information on the genera Lunella, Modelia and Turbo (vol. I). In: G.T. Poppe & K. Groh (eds), A Conchological Iconography. Hackenheim: Conchbooks. pp. 69–72, pls 96-103

External links
 

walteri
Gastropods described in 2009